is a district located in Kagoshima Prefecture, Japan.

As of October 1, 2008, the district has an estimated Population of 1,087 and a Density of 8.19 persons/km2. The total area is 132.71 km2.

The district has two villages and both of them were islands within Oshima District. The district once located on the mainland is now entirely merged into the city of Kagoshima.
Mishima
Toshima

District timeline
April 1, 1889
Due to the city status enforcement, the city of Kagoshima was formed.
Due to the towns and village status enforcement, the villages of Yoshida, Yoshino, Ishiki, Nishitakeda, and　Nakagōriu were formed within the district. (5 villages)
April 1, 1897 - The district absorbed Kitaosumi and Taniyama Districts and added the villages of Nishisakurajima, Higashisakurajima, and Taniyama. (8 villages)
September 1, 1924 - The village of Taniyama gained town status to become the town of Taniyama. (1 town, 7 villages)
August 1, 1934 - The villages of Yoshino, Nishitakeda, and Nakagōriu merged into the city of Kagoshima. (1 town, 4 villages)
October 1, 1950 - The villages of Higashisakurajima and Ishiki were merged into the city of Kagoshima. (1 town, 2 villages)
October 1, 1958 - The town of Taniyama gained city status to become the city of Taniyama. (2 villages)
November 1, 1972 - The village of Yoshida gained town status to become the town of Yoshida. (1 town, 1 villages)
April 1, 1973 - The district acquired the villages of Mishima and Toshima from Ōshima District. (1 town, 3 villages)
May 1, 1973 - The village of Nishisakurajima gained town status and renamed to become the town of Sakurajima. (2 towns, 2 villages)
November 1, 2004 - The towns of Yoshida and Sakurajima merged into the city of Kagoshima. (2 villages)

Districts in Kagoshima Prefecture
District Kagoshima